Molveno is a comune (municipality) in Trentino in the northern Italian region of Trentino-Alto Adige/Südtirol, located about  northwest of Trento. It is famous for its positioning on Lake Molveno as a holiday destination, its nearby ski resorts (Andalo-Paganella) and its connection to the National Park Adamello Brenta.

Geography

The Lake of Molveno, formed by a landslide about 4000 years ago, is the second largest in Trentino-Alto Adige, . It's famous for its diverse fish species, including trout, arctic char and perch.

Molveno borders the following municipalities: Andalo, Cavedago, Ragoli, San Lorenzo in Banale, Spormaggiore, Terlago, Tuenno and Vezzano.

History
The area of Molveno is known to have been settled since the Neolithic age. Due to its strategic position at the entrance of the Brenta-Paganella plateau, it was contended between the Bishops of Trento, the counts of Tyrol and the counts of Flavon.

From 1802 to 1805 the Austrians had a series of fortification built on the lake to halt the French troops.

References

External links

 Molveno official website
Molveno touristic website

it is also home to Molveno F.C

Cities and towns in Trentino-Alto Adige/Südtirol